The Technical Research Centre for Dependency Care and Autonomous Living (CETpD) is an applied research and technology transfer centre created for the Universitat Politèncica de Catalunya and the Fundació Hospital Comarcal Sant Antoni Abat on behalf of the Consorci de Servei a les Persones de Vilanova i la Geltrú, with the aim of covering the demand for research and development in the field of Gerontechnology, Ambient Intelligence, Assistive Robotics and User Experience Technologies.

The CETpD carried out important applied research work and innovation on socially relevant developments, especially on technologies and systems designed to enhance independent living of elderly and disabled people.

Areas

Ambient Intelligence 
Ambient Intelligence (AmI) implies an environment of distributed computing systems, unobstrusive and often invisible, with user friendly interfaces capable of learning and adapting to the particular needs of the users.
CETpD AmI projects are included in the assistance field mainly for housing and health application. We are looking for technological solutions that have the potential to include everyone, that are affordable and build trust and confidence directed to improve the quality of life of any person specially elders and disabled.

Assistive Robotics 
The priority lines of work are three:
 To develop new architectures of control and forms of signal processing which the robots allow to capture knowledge and being cognitive through the human-machine interaction.
 To research in the more suitable forms of interaction, so they are motivating and satisfying for the user.
 To develop in an effective way robotic systems that are capable of supplying with personalised individual assistance to people with dependence (permanent, rehabilitation or convalescence). Therefore, the research implies areas like HRI, control and systems of computational learning in complex, changing and uncertain environments, integrating processes of perception, representation and interaction with people.

Usability 
The purpose of the user experience field, usability, is to provide relevant information about users expectations, capabilities and preferences, in order to ensure that products and services would meet end users -and other stakeholders- functional and affective needs. All the CETpD projects incorporates user's experience feedback in the process of contextual product and services development.

Balance, Gaits and Falls 
Gait alterations, balance alterations and falls are major causes of disability in the elderly population. Such pathologies seriously impair elders' quality of life; furthermore, their consequences have high economic and social impact. Therefore, clinical and epidemiological studies on these pathologies are conducted at the CETpD in order to gain insight into their causes and to find novel therapeutics.

Gerontechnology 
A major objective in geriatrics is to maintain elderly persons' independence to carry out their daily life activities and to interact with their environment. In this regard, technology may be an essential tool to facilitate elderly persons' autonomy. At the CETpD, they develop technology aimed to their environment, as well as remote diagnosis devices designed for early detection of health alterations in frail persons or persons living alone.

References

External links
 CETpD web site
 CETpD youtube channel
 UPC web site
 Fundació Hospital Comarcal Sant Antoni Abat web site

Software engineering organizations
Computer science education
Gerontology organizations
Robotics organizations